Qaladze is a town in Kurdistan Region, Iraq, north of Sulaymaniyah, near the Iranian border. It is surrounded by mountains like many parts of Kurdistan. The town is located in the middle of Pshdar District.

Etymology
Qalladze means "Castle of Two Rivers" from the Kurdish words Qala= castle, dw= two and ze= river. In the southwest of the city there is a castle between two rivers.

History
The town was destroyed by Saddam Hussein's government during the Iran–Iraq War and all residents were forced to leave the town and moved to Bazzian and other parts of Iraqi Kurdistan, but mostly they were moved to some camps somewhere near Bazzian, a small town located west of Slemani. The people who have  been moved, stayed there until the Kurdish uprising against Saddam Hussein's regime in 1991. Then they came back to their land. The town has continued to expand. A branch of the Sulaimania University was established there in 1974, but the Iraqi government attacked it on April 24, 1974.

At 9.15am on Wednesday 24 April 1974, Qalladze fell victim to Saddam Hussein first airstrike against the Kurds. It was rumoured that the town attracted the eye of Saddam Hussein because the University of Slemani* had temporarily relocated to Qalladze on 1 April 1974 – under the command of leader Mustafa Barzani who led the Kurdish revolution. More than 425 students and teachers re-located to Qalladze as a show of solidarity to Mustafa Barzani's decision which angered the Ba’athi government. Bomber planes, rockets and internationally prohibited cannon fires set alight the town of Qalladze, the Ba’athist government had demolished the town of Qalladze and it is said that more than 132 children and students alone were killed during the attacks, with over 400 Kurds injured or missing. Although the exact number of victims is unclear, some estimate that over 350 people, including students and teachers died. Two days after the Iraqi government's first airstrike on the Kurds, attentions were turned to the town of Halabja – the second victim of Saddam Hussein's airstrikes.

On 10 February  2013, the council ministers of the Kurdish Regional Government elected 24 April as the University Martyrs Day; a homage to the fallen martyrs of Sulaymaniyah University (now known as Salahaddin University).

Climate

Qaladiza has a hot-summer Mediterranean (Csa) according to Köppen climate classification with hot, dry summers and cool, rainy winters. Winter nights average below freezing and snow occasionally occurs.
<div style="width:75%">

References

External links 

 Geography of Kurdistan-Iraq

Populated places in Sulaymaniyah Province
Geography of Iraqi Kurdistan
Kurdish settlements in Iraq